Tourist Trap is a Welsh TV mockumentary-style comedy series following the fictional tourist board WOW Wales. Sally Phillips heads the cast as the director of the organization. The show was first broadcast on BBC One Wales in 2018 as part of the channel's Festival Of Funny.

Production 
Tourist Trap shares a production company (The Comedy Unit), executive producer (Rab Christie) and some members of its production team with the stylistically similar shows Scot Squad and Soft Border Patrol, which are broadcast on BBC Scotland and BBC Northern Ireland respectively. All three are semi-improvised sketch-shows, filmed in a mockumentary style and initially comprised stand-alone scenes set within the individual departments of the fictional organizations they follow. However in the Six Nations special and series 2 of Tourist Trap, the show began to deviate from this template as episodes would sometimes incorporate a narrative and the show also saw members of individual departments appear in other team's scenes.

The show reflects contemporary Welsh events including the rugby team's performance, the appearance of a new Banksy artwork in Port Talbot and the increased popularity in DNA tourism.

In June 2020, during the COVID-19 pandemic, a single radio edition of the show was broadcast on BBC Radio Wales. Using the same format as the television show, The Stay At Home Radio Special dealt with the characters having to work from home and interact via telephone and Zoom as the organization changed its message and asked tourists not to visit Wales during lockdown.

Cast 
 Sally Phillips - Elaine Gibbons
 Elis James - Nez
 Mike Bubbins - Wyn
 Mali Ann Rees - Kara
 Mari Beard - Charlotte
 Leroy Brito - Rob
 Tom Price - Jon
 Remy Beasley - Hari (Series 1)
 Eleri Morgan - Gwen (Series 2)
 Lloyd Everitt - Iestyn (Series 2)
 Sara Gregory - Amy
 Tudur Owen - Gwilym
 Sion Pritchard - Mark
 Sarah Breese - Kath
 Richard Elis - Marshall
 Gareth Gwynn - Radio DJ (Voice)
 Jenna Preece - Rachel
 Sian Harries - Meinir

Guest appearances as themselves
 Derek Brockway
 Eggsy
 Gareth Edwards
 Neville Wilshire
 Scott Quinnell
 Jason Mohammed

References

External links
 
 Tourist Trap BBC
 British Comedy Guide
 Evening Standard
 Cast & Crew

2018 British television series debuts
2010s British comedy-drama television series
British comedy television shows
English-language television shows
Television series by Banijay
Television shows set in Wales